Revista de la Habana (1853-1857) was a Spanish language literary magazine produced in Havana, Cuba. Quintiliano Garcia and  founded and edited it.

References

External links
  (fulltext)
 WorldCat

1853 establishments in Cuba
1857 disestablishments in North America
Defunct literary magazines
Defunct magazines published in Cuba
Magazines established in 1853
Magazines disestablished in 1857
Mass media in Havana
Spanish-language magazines